Inyoite, named after Inyo County, California, where it was discovered in 1914, is a colourless monoclinic mineral. It turns white on dehydration. Its chemical formula is Ca(HBO)(OH)·4HO or CaB3O3(OH)5·4H2O. Associated minerals include priceite, meyerhofferite, colemanite, hydroboracite, ulexite and gypsum.

References

Nesoborates
Monoclinic minerals
Minerals in space group 14
Luminescent minerals